Luisa Stefani and Rafael Matos defeated Sania Mirza and Rohan Bopanna in the final, 7–6(7–2), 6–2 to win the mixed doubles tennis title at the 2023 Australian Open. They became the first Brazilian pair to win the title in the Open Era, and Stefani became the first Brazilian woman to win a mixed doubles major title since Maria Bueno at the 1960 French Championships. This tournament marked the final major appearance of three-time mixed doubles major champion Mirza.

Kristina Mladenovic and Ivan Dodig were the reigning champions, but Dodig chose not to defend his title. Mladenovic partnered with Juan Sebastián Cabal, but lost in the second round to Maddison Inglis and Jason Kubler.

Desirae Krawczyk attempted to complete the career Grand Slam in mixed doubles, partnered with Neal Skupski, but lost in the semifinals to Mirza and Bopanna.

Seeds

Draw

Finals

Top half

Bottom half

Other entry information

Wild cards

Alternates

Withdrawals

References

External links 
 Draw

Australian Open (tennis) by year – Mixed doubles
2023 WTA Tour
2023 ATP Tour
2023 Australian Open